Stewart Tan Seng Teong is a Chinese motorsport executive, founder and general manager of Zhuhai International Circuit in Guangdong province.

Career
Stewart Tan Seng Teong was born and raised in a big Chinese family in Penang, Malaysia. His family has a name in the Chinese medical field. Instead of taking over the family company, he engaged in other business activities. He worked in the Hong Kong share market during the late 80s, and has experience in managing shares and investments especially those in China. He was also the co-founder of the Chinese chocolate brand, Le Conte, later moving on from that business.

In 1992, he worked with the city government of Zhuhai to build the first motor racing circuit in China, which became Zhuhai International Circuit. He also took part in organising the first official street racing circuit in Zhuhai, on which events were held between 1993 and 1995 before the permanent circuit was built. In 1994, he and his group of organizers brought the BPR Global Endurance GT to Zhuhai.

In 1997, Tan partnered with Elf and Renault of France to bring “Formula Campus” (a junior formula) to China, established Formula Racing Development Ltd (FRD Motorsports). At the same time he set up the first racing school in China and organized China’s first formula racing series.

He was the Team Principal of the Volkswagen China (FAW) Factory Rally Team in 1999. The car used at that time was the Volkswagen Jetta.

From 2004 to 2007, Tan brought FIA GT Championship to Zhuhai International Circuit. In 2006, he created the Pan Delta Super Racing Festival, a regular event that included the Circuit Hero race. Race drivers, race fans and the media in the Pearl River Delta region took part in this festival, and it attracted sponsors including Frestech, Red Bull, Coca-Cola, and Audi.

In 2007, Tan worked with China Motor Sport Association (CMSA) to create the China Superbike Championship, with two races in Zhuhai, one in Beijing and one in Shanghai. Over the 5 years, Tongyi Iced Tea and Yulin Pharmaceutical have sponsored that championship. In December of the same year, A1GP World Cup of Motorsport came to the track; in this race A1 Team China driver Cheng Congfu achieved a podium finish. Due to his series of successes in 2007, Stewart was awarded the “Man of the Year” by Autonews Magazine at the Golden Autosport Awards in 2008.

Tan is currently the General Manager of Zhuhai International Circuit Ltd. In 2010 and 2011, under his leadership, the circuit signed an agreement with Automobile Club de l’Ouest to bring the Intercontinental Le Mans Cup to Zhuhai. In 2011, the Zhuhai Municipal Government also hosted a China Zhuhai International Motor Sport Festival to help promote the event in the city.

References

Living people
Auto racing executives
Chinese businesspeople
People from Penang
Year of birth missing (living people)